The 1989–90 Crvena zvezda season is the 45th season in the existence of the club. The team played in the Yugoslav Federal A League and the FIBA Korać Cup.

Overview 
Guards Nebojša Ilić and Saša Obradović, and forward Slobodan Kaličanin were ruled out for the season due to the compulsory military service in the Yugoslav People's Army. Youth players Dragan Aleksić, Mirko Pavlović, Dušan Stević, Mlađan Šilobad, and Časlav Trifunović were promoted from the junior selection.

Players

Squad information

Transactions

Players In 

|}

Players Out 

|}

Compulsory military service 

|}

Competitions

Overall

Overview

Yugoslav Federal League

Regular season 

Source: Yugoslav First Basketball League Archive

Matches

Playoffs 

Source

Korać Cup 

Source

Yugoslav Cup 

Source

Statistics

Yugoslav League (Regular Season)

Yugoslav League (Playoffs)

Korać Cup

Yugoslav Cup

References

External links 
 KK Crvena zvezda official website

KK Crvena Zvezda seasons
Crvena zvezda